Caduceus is the ancient symbol of messengers, often confused with the medical symbol the Rod of Asclepius.

Caduceus may also refer to:

Caduceus as a symbol of medicine
CADUCEUS (expert system), the medical expert system
Caduceus (horse), The New Zealand racehorse and trotting champion
Caduceus (ship), The 19th century convict ship
Caduceus Cellars, The winery
HMS Caduceus
Caduceus Clay, a fictional firbolg cleric in the D&D Web Series Critical Role
NASA's name for a hypothetical moon of Mercury in a 2012 April Fool's Day joke
Super Surgical Operation: Caduceus, a video game (called Trauma Center: Under the Knife in the American edition) for the Nintendo DS